Tony Frederick Heinz (born 30 April 1956 in Palo Alto) is an American physicist.

Biography
Heinz studied at Stanford University, earning a bachelor's degree in 1978. He received his doctorate in 1982 at the University of California, Berkeley, in physics. From 1983 to 1995 he was at the Thomas J. Watson Research Center of IBM. He was a professor at Columbia University and is  now a professor at Stanford University. He served as president of The Optical Society in 2021.

Research
His research focuses on ultrafast laser spectroscopy (femtosecond pulses) and thus investigates dynamics at surfaces. His group investigates electronic and optical properties of a few atoms of thin two-dimensional systems (such as graphene or ultrathin crystals of transition-metal di-chalcogen compounds).

Heinz is one of the most cited scientists. Since 2019, the media group Clarivate counts him among the favorites for a Nobel Prize (Clarivate Citation Laureates).

Awards and honors 
 2020 William F. Meggers Award from The Optical Society "For seminal studies of the properties and dynamics of surfaces, interfaces, and nanoscale materials by diverse spectroscopic techniques, including through the development of powerful new methods."
 2008 he earned the Julius Springer Prize for Applied Physics. 
 1996 he earned the Humboldt Prize. 
 Fellow of the American Physical Society. 
 Fellow of The Optical Society.

Selected publications

References

External links 
 Heinz Group, Stanford

1956 births
Living people
Stanford University alumni
University of California, Berkeley alumni
Stanford University Department of Physics faculty
21st-century  American  physicists
20th-century  American  physicists
Spectroscopists
Fellows of the American Physical Society